Chiromantis is a genus of frogs in the family Rhacophoridae, commonly known as foam-nest frogs or foam-nest tree frogs. It contains species from the Sub-Saharan African tropics. Following the molecular genetic study by Chen and colleagues (2020), the Asian species formerly assigned to Chiromantis have now been reclassified to the resurrected genus Chirixalus.

Description
Chiromantis lay their eggs in terrestrial foam nests.

Species
The following species are recognised in the genus Chiromantis:
 Chiromantis kelleri Boettger, 1893
 Chiromantis petersii Boulenger, 1882
 Chiromantis rufescens (Günther, 1869)
 Chiromantis xerampelina Peters, 1854

References

External links

Chiromantis at CalPhotos

 
Rhacophoridae
Amphibian genera
Amphibians of Sub-Saharan Africa
Taxa named by Wilhelm Peters